Subir Nandi (19 November 1953 – 7 May 2019) was a Bangladeshi musician.  He won Bangladesh National Film Award for Best Male Playback Singer five times for his performance in the films Mahanayak (1984), Shuvoda (1986), Srabon Megher Din (1999), Megher Pore Megh (2004) and Mohua Sundori (2015). He was awarded Ekushey Padak in 2019 by the Government of Bangladesh.

Early life
Nandi was born in Nandi Para, Baniachong, Habiganj in present-day Bangladesh. He spent his childhood in Teliapara Tea Estate, Habiganj. His father was a doctor (Medical Corps of The British Army) and medical officer at Teliapara Tea Estate. Nandi has eight siblings. All nine of them learnt music from Ustad Babar Ali Khan. He grew up listening to Pankaj Mullick, Kundan Lal Saigal, Sandhya Mukhopadhyay, and Manna Dey.

Career
Nandi's musical career started since 1970s. His works in the film Mahanayak (1984) got him the breakthrough and also received his first national film award. He went on singing songs like Shrabon Megher Din and Megher Opare Megh. In an interview with BTV he claimed that he had sung already 2000 film songs setting the record of second highest number of songs sung by any male singer only after Andrew Kishore.

In 1972, Nandi recorded his first song, Jodi Keu Dhup Jele Deye, written by Mohammed Muzakker and composed by Ustad Mir Kasem. In 1979, he sang Din Jaye Kotha Thake from a film with the same title. The lyrics were written by Khan Ataur Rahman.

Nandi learnt folk music from Bidit Lal Das, a folk singer. Nandi became a member of a musical band named Bidit Lal Das and His Team, founded in 1972. Other members included Akramul Islam, Jamaluddin Banna, Rakhal Chakrabarty, Himangshu Goswami and Himangshu Biswas.

In 1994, Nandi rendered songs at the House of Commons of the United Kingdom.

Personal life
Nandi married Purabi Nandi in 1981. Together they had a daughter, named Falguni Nandi.

Awards
 Bangladesh National Film Award for Best Male Playback Singer; 1984, 1986, 1999, 2004, 2015
 Citibank Lifetime Achievement award; 2012
 Bangladesh Film Journalist Association awards; 1977, 1982, 1985 and 1986
 Ekushey Padak for music; 2019

Discography
Studio albums
 Dukher Pore Shukh
 Prem Bole Kichu Nei
 Valobasha Kokhono Morena
 Surer Bhubone 
 Ganer Sure Amay Pabe 2015

Films
 Devdas (1982)
 Mahanayak (1984)
 Simana Periye (1985)
 Ammajan (1999)
 Srabon Megher Din (1999)
 Chandrokotha (2004)
 Megher Opare Megh (2004)
 Shudha (2004)
 Shasti (2006)

Songs
 Amar E Duti Chokh
 Ekta Chilo Sonar Konya
 Bha-lobashi Shokaley
 Tomare Chharite Bondhu
 Tumi Emoni Jaal Pe-techho Shongshare
 Ami Brishtir Kachh Theke
 Koto Je Tomake Beshechhi Bhalo
 Chandey Kolongko Achhey Jemon
 Keno Bha-lobasha Hariye Jaye
 O Amar Ural Pongkhirey
 Bondhu Hote Cheye
 Bondhu Tor Borat Niya
 Paharer Kanna Dekhe
 Hajar Moner Kachhe

Film songs

References

External links

1953 births
2019 deaths
People from Baniachong Upazila
20th-century Bangladeshi male singers
Bangladeshi Hindus
21st-century Bangladeshi male singers
Bangladeshi playback singers
Best Male Playback Singer National Film Award (Bangladesh) winners
Recipients of the Ekushey Padak
Deaths from multiple organ failure